Ju Wenjun (born 31 January 1991) is a Chinese chess grandmaster. She is the current Women's World Chess Champion. In March 2017 she became the fifth woman to achieve a rating of 2600. She is a three-time Women's World Chess Champion having won the title in May 2018, November 2018 and 2020. She is scheduled to play a match to defend her world title in 2023.

Career
In December 2004, Ju Wenjun placed third in the Asian Women's Chess Championship in Beirut. This result qualified her to play in her first Women's World Chess Championship in 2006. She competed in this event also in 2008, 2010, 2012, 2015 and 2017.

She won the Women's Chinese Chess Championship in 2010 and 2014. In July 2011 she won the Hangzhou Women Grandmaster Chess Tournament undefeated with a score of 6½/9 points, ahead of the then women's world champion Hou Yifan. In October 2011 she took the second place at the Nalchik stage of the FIDE Women's Grand Prix 2011–12 with 7/11, ranked only after her compatriot Zhao Xue; her performance was enough to acquire her third and final norm required for the Grandmaster title. However, one of the three norms was missing the signature of the arbiter, disqualifying her for consideration for the title.

From June 18 to July 2, 2014, in the 5th stage of the FIDE Women's Grand Prix 2013–14 held in Lopota, Georgia she finished jointly second with Elina Danielian and a 7/11 score. This marks her fourth GM norm. In the 6th stage of the FIDE Women's Grand Prix 2013–14 held in Sharjah, United Arab Emirates, from August 24 to September 7, 2014 she placed joint first with Hou Yifan with a score of 8.5/11, winning the event thanks to a better tiebreak score.

In November 2014, FIDE awarded her the GM title in the 4th quarter Presidential Board meeting in Sochi, Russia. With six GM norms, including three norms from the Women's Grand Prix (1 from each series), she is now a fully fledged grandmaster, China's 31st grandmaster and the 31st woman to hold the title. Also in 2014, she tied for first with Lei Tingjie in the 4th China Women Masters Tournament in Wuxi.

In December 2017, Ju won the Women's World Rapid Chess Championship in Riyadh, and won in the same championship held in St. Petersburg in December 2018, scoring 11½/15 (+8=7) and 10/12 (+8=4), respectively.

World championship

Ju Wenjun won FIDE Women's Grand Prix 2015–16. This qualified her for a match for the women's world championship against incumbent champion Tan Zhongyi. Ju won the match in May 2018, becoming women's world champion.

The next women's world championship was decided by a 64-player knockout tournament. Ju won the tournament, which was held in November 2018, retaining the women's world chess champion title. 

In January 2020, Ju successfully defended her title in a match against Aleksandra Goryachkina in the Women's World Chess Championship 2020. She won with the score of 2.5–1.5 in the rapid tiebreaker after having equalized the classical time control games 6–6.

Team events
Ju Wenjun has played for the Chinese national women's team since 2008. Her team has won the gold medal in the 42nd Chess Olympiad in 2016, Women's World Team Chess Championship in 2009 and 2011, Women's Asian Nations Chess Cup in 2012, 2014 and 2016, gold medal in the Olympiad at 2018, and 2010 Asian Games.

In 2013, she won the silver medal with team Shanghai in the Asian Cities Chess Championship in Dubai.

She plays for the Shanghai chess club in the China Chess League (CCL).

References

External links

 
 
 
 

1991 births
Living people
Chinese female chess players
Chess grandmasters
Female chess grandmasters
Chess players from Shanghai
Women's world chess champions
Chess Olympiad competitors
Asian Games medalists in chess
Asian Games gold medalists for China
Chess players at the 2010 Asian Games
Medalists at the 2010 Asian Games
Universiade medalists in chess
Universiade gold medalists for China
Universiade silver medalists for China
Medalists at the 2013 Summer Universiade